Shenzhenbei (Shenzhen North) Railway Station is one of the four large intercity railway stations of Shenzhen, located in Longhua District. It has 11 platforms and 20 lines. It is an interchange station between the Guangzhou–Shenzhen–Hong Kong Express Rail Link, the Hangzhou–Fuzhou–Shenzhen High-Speed Railway, future Shenzhen–Zhanjiang high-speed railway and the Shenzhen Metro Lines 4, 5 and 6. Construction started in 2007 and was completed in June 2011. The Line 4 and Line 5 platforms opened on 22 June 2011, CRH platforms opened on 26 December 2011 and Line 6 platforms opened on 18 August 2020.

High speed trains run from Shenzhen North train station to Beijing West railway station, Xiamen and Guangzhou.

History

Planning and design
Since 1980, Shenzhen Special Economic Zone, the established Shenzhen railway station has been the main railway terminal locally. But with the increasing frequency of trains, the original station has insufficient space to use. It is located in the city center and close to the border can not be expanded. So in the late 1990s, it was proposed for the construction of a second railway terminal in Shenzhen. Prior to the completion of a second terminal, in the interim many long-distance trains in Shenzhen were able to use the temporary Shenzhen West railway station, (now permanent).

In November 2003, the Shenzhen Municipal Government completed a new planning study that suggested that a new station to serve the Beijing–Guangzhou–Shenzhen–Hong Kong High-Speed Railway, Guangzhou–Shenzhen–Hong Kong Express Rail Link and the Xiamen–Shenzhen Railway would be located in Longhua District, Shenzhen in order to be central to all of Shenzhen.

In July–October 2005, the Shenzhen Municipal Government and the Ministry of Railways jointly launched the "National Railway Passenger Station in Shenzhen Comprehensive Plan International Advisory", inviting four foreign and three domestic design companies to submit their ideas to the Railway Survey and Design Institute. All submitting a preliminary plan for Shenzhen North station as an integrated hub in the planning. In August 2006, the two sides jointly signed a memorandum to construct the station. In June 2007, the Ministry of Railways launched a project feasibility study & preliminary designs, which were completed in November 2007. Differences between the Shenzhen authorities and the Ministry of Railways caused for a changing of views on the relationship between railway stations and urban transport, causing a delay in the coordination of planning. The final plans were only unveiled in 2008.

Renamed
Numerous names were mooted for new project, with some being used in early announcements and planning documents, such as the New Station in Shenzhen, Shenzhen New railway station, Longhua railway station and others. On December 23, 2008, the Shenzhen Municipal Planning Bureau issued a public notice, the new Shenzhen station was officially named "Shenzhen North station". Another station on the Guangzhou-Shenzhen Railway, formerly known as freight Shenzhen North station & marshalling yard, was renamed Sun Gang station to avoid confusion.

Metro station
Shenzhen Metro Line 4 was opened and put into operation on 16 June 2011, but Shenzhen North station did not open. It wasn't until 22 June 2011, in which at this time the Line 4 platform was opened in tandem with Line 5 several days later on 22 June 2011, allowing for the Shenzhen North East Square to be officially opened. For up to six months before the high-speed railway was completed, the Shenzhen North Station subway and bus shuttle transfer hall functioned.

The opening of the high-speed rail station (2011-12)
The high-speed rail section of the Shenzhen North railway station had repeatedly delayed the opening time. It changed from before the November 2010 Guangzhou Asian Games to December 28 and then changed to 8 August 2011 and again postponed to 26 December 2011. Influenced by the 2011 Wenzhou high-speed train rear-end accident, coupled with the Chinese government beginning to reflect on the construction of all high-speed rail, this caused a slow down in high-speed rail construction and other issues. On December 26, 2011 morning, the Guangzhou-Shenzhen-Hong Kong Express Rail Link's Guangzhou-Shenzhen section, opening ceremony was held in Shenzhen North Station, with the Minister of Railways Sheng Guangzu, the Guangdong Provincial Party Secretary Wang Yang, the former governor of Guangdong Province Huang Hua Hua and acting governor of Guangdong Zhu Xiaodan, who attended the ceremony. The first train G6126 left at 10:40am and in 28 minutes arrived at Guangzhou South railway station.

Initial opening services were from Shenzhen North Station to Guangzhou South Station. Passengers wanting to travel between Wuhan and Guangzhou high-speed railway stations, had to transfer at Guangzhou South railway station. From 1 April 2012, the frequency of trains to Shenzhen North Station increased to 20 pairs, mostly to Wuhan railway station and Changsha South railway station.

A project to increase capacity of the station was completed in December 2020.

Station structure
Shenzhen North station is located in Shenzhen Bao'an District Longhua  from the downtown area of Shenzhen. Its site is located in the geometric center of Shenzhen and population centers, with more favorable conditions for the development.

The whole site is divided into three parts: the high-speed rail station house, East Plaza and West Plaza. The total land area extends about 650,000 square meters, with a construction area of about 400,000 square meters. Among them, the high-speed railway was in a north-south direction, with the station building located on the top of the tracks ; the East Square is dominated by public transport interchange; West Plaza has most of the private car parking and long distance bus terminal.

Line 4 of the Shenzhen Metro located in Shenzhen North Station's East Square in an elevated station, running substantially parallel with the high-speed rail station under the large shared roof. The Pingnan Railway runs from east to west under the entire station but has no platforms and no services stop on this line. Line 5 of the Shenzhen Metro also runs east-west under the station complex. A substantial internal road network was developed to reduce the effect of taxi and bus traffic on the local road network.

Site layout

Platform layout

CRH

Shenzhen Metro

Intercity services
As of October 2012, Shenzhen North station is the terminal for numerous G-series trains on the Shenzhen-Guangzhou-Wuhan-Zhengzhou high-speed line. One of these trains continues on to Xi'an. Commencing on December 26, 2012, trains now operate between Shenzhen North and Beijing West, making it the longest high speed rail journey possible in the world.

All other Shenzhen's trains are served elsewhere. Less expensive D-series trains to Guangzhou, as well as various "conventional" trains to destinations throughout China leave from Shenzhen railway station; there is also a much less busy Shenzhen West railway station. Shenzhen East railway station opened in December 2012 to handle regional services and connected to Shenzhen North on the soon to be completed Hangzhou–Fuzhou–Shenzhen High-Speed Railway.

Vienna Hotels has its corporate headquarters in the Vienna International Hotel located at the station.

Gallery

Exits

References

See also
 Guangzhou–Shenzhen–Hong Kong Express Rail Link
 Shenzhen Metro

Railway stations in Shenzhen
Railway stations in China opened in 2011
Shenzhen Metro stations
Longhua District, Shenzhen